The Department of Criminal Intelligence (DCI) was established in April 1904 under Sir Harold Stuart on recommendations of Sir Andrew Fraser, following the report of the 1903 Police Commission instituted by the then Viceroy of India Lord Curzon. After Indian independence in 1947, Central Criminal Intelligence Department was renamed as the Department of Criminal Intelligence (DCI) is India's domestic intelligence, counter-terrorism, and criminal Investigation agency, Under the Ministry of Home Affairs Government of India. The agency is tasked with national security and criminal matters.

History

Central Criminal Intelligence Department
was established in April 1904 under Sir Harold Stuart on recommendations of Sir Andrew Fraser, following the report of the 1903 Police Commission instituted by the then Viceroy of India Lord Curzon After Indian independence in 1947, Central Criminal Intelligence Department was renamed as the Department of Criminal Intelligence (DCI)

Notes

References

 

1904 establishments in India
Indian intelligence agencies
Government agencies established in 1904
Government agencies of India
Federal law enforcement agencies of India